Alexander Scammell (March 22, 1747 – October 6, 1781) was a Harvard educated attorney and an officer in the Continental Army during the American Revolutionary War.  He was wounded on September 30, 1781, near Yorktown and subsequently died on October 6 in Williamsburg, Virginia, making him, a colonel, the highest ranking American officer killed during the Siege of Yorktown.


Biography
Scammell was born March 22, 1747, in the part of Mendon, Massachusetts, which eventually became Milford, Massachusetts. His father, Doctor Samuel Leslie Scammell died in 1753 and Alexander and his older brother, Samuel (b. 1739) were placed under the care and guidance of Reverend Amariah Frost.  As a young man, Alexander graduated from Harvard College in 1769, and then moved to Plymouth County, MA where he taught school in the towns of Kingston and Plymouth and became a member of the Old Colony Club celebrating the Plymouth landing.  In 1772 he moved to Portsmouth, NH where he worked surveying and exploring the lands of the Royal Navy Timber.  When not surveying, he kept a school at Berwick, was one of the proprietors of the town of Shapleigh, ME.  He also assisted Captain Samuel Holland in making surveys for his  Topographical Map of New Hampshire.

Subsequently, in 1773 Scammell began to read law with John Sullivan, later General Sullivan, of Durham, New Hampshire." Scammell had a high opinion of Sullivan whom he styled, "an excellent instructor and worthy patron". Sullivan was a member of the Congress of 1774 and 1775, and the following year he was appointed a brigadier general by that Congress. Scammell was with Sullivan during the Capture of Fort William and Mary on December 14, 1774.

With the start of the American Revolution, Scammell became a major in the 2nd New Hampshire Regiment, which was in Sullivan's Brigade, and after the Siege of Boston was sent with them to reinforce the Continental Army units in the Invasion of Canada. Sullivan's force returned to Fort Ticonderoga by mid July 1776, and by August Scammell had been assigned as Aide-de-Camp to Sullvan.  But in September he was ordered to Assist Col George Reid in New York City and fought at the Battle of Long Island. In October 1776 he was appointed Assistant Adjutant General for Charles Lee's Division.  In November 1776, Scammell was promoted to colonel.  Then on 11 December 1776 he was given command of the 3rd New Hampshire Regiment. However, as that regiment had not yet been recruited (the company officers spent the early months of 1777 recruiting), Scammell accompanied the 1st and 2nd regiments under Col John Stark south to join Washington's Army.  In this capacity Scammell crossed the Delaware with Washington and took part in the Battle of Trenton and the Battle of Princeton.  In the latter Scammell is recalled to have preceded Washington in rallying the troops who were being beaten badly.  Both officers came through unscathed with earned reputations as extraordinary battlefield leaders.

The recruiting of the 3rd NH Regiment was completed in June 1777, and within two weeks of men mustering for the first time at Fort Ticonderoga did Major General Arthur St. Clair order its evacuation. Scammell commanded the regiment at Saratoga, and distinguished himself bravely in the battles of Freeman's Farm and Bemis Heights, and was possibly wounded in the latter battle (In letters to his brother he did not indicate being wounded and that bullets had passed through his clothing and hit the breech of his weapon). At this time Henry Dearborn, (who later became secretary of War under President Thomas Jefferson), and his light infantry were under his command. Just two days after Burgoyne's surrender the regiment moved to winter quarters at Valley Forge where Scammell was appointed adjutant general of the Continental Army by Gen. George Washington. Scammell served in this capacity through 1780. In October 1780 Scammell was appointed as executioner to Major John André, a duty that weighed heavily on him.  The result was a letter of Nov 16, 1780 to Washington requesting permission to resign his post and take command of a regiment of the line.

He was ultimately replaced in early 1781 by Edward Hand. Scammell was reassigned as commander of the 1st NH Regiment in early 1781. However, on May 17, 1781, he was assigned command of a light infantry detachment that became known as Scammell's Light Infantry, and this regiment fought at the Battle of King's Bridge, and was the vanguard for the Army's march South to Yorktown. Once at Yorktown the regiment was organized as part of the 2nd brigade of The Light Infantry Division at Yorktown (1781).

On September 30, 1781, while serving as Field Officer-of-the-Day, Scammell was wounded while reconnoitering recently abandoned British fortifications. He had become separated from his scouting party, encountered a party of British light dragoons, and was shot in the side (accounts differ as to whether this occurred before or after he surrendered).  He was taken into Yorktown, but because of the gravity of his wound he was paroled to Williamsburg, only to die on October 6. Possibly he was buried in Williamsburg A monument was erected in Williamsburg to Scammell but may never have been engraved the following inscription:

The inscription was written by Scammell's friend, Col. David Humphreys of Rhode Island.

A commemorative engraving, entitled "Death of Col. Scammell at the Siege of Yorktown", by Alonzo Chappel, was published by Johnson Fry & Company, NY, in 1859.

Both Alexander Scammell Wadsworth and Henry Alexander Scammell Dearborn were named by his friends Peleg Wadsworth and Henry Dearborn in memory of him.  Lieutenant Colonel Alexander Scammell Brooks, the son of Colonel John Brooks of Massachusetts, who would later become the 11th governor of that state, was born Oct 19, 1781. 

Fort Scammell in Casco Bay, Maine, is named after him. Also in 1933, the Alexander Scammell Bridge over the Bellamy River near Durham, New Hampshire, was named after him and a street was named in his honor at the time of the founding of Marietta, Ohio, the first establishment in the Northwest Territory.

Alexander Scammell was a tall man for the times.  Accounts differ, with him described as being 6'2" to 6'5" tall with blue eyes and a fair complexion.  As a member of Washington's inner circle for three years, he was known for having an easy manner and being one of the few people who could lighten the moods of and make George Washington laugh with his humorous stories and jokes. In fact Washington considered Scammell to be one of the funniest men in the army.  Scammell had the rare ability to lead and inspire loyalty as evinced by one of his captains, who at the Siege of Yorktown shortly after the taking of Redoubt #10, sacrificed his own honor by threatening the life of the captured Major Campbell to avenge his favorite (Col Scammell); Alexander Hamilton, who commanded the American assault, interceded saved Major Campbell.

See also
New Hampshire Historical Marker No. 165: The Alexander Scammell Bridge over the Bellamy River

References

Shipton, Clifford. Sibley's Harvard Graduates, volume 17. Boston: Massachusetts Historical Society, 1975.

External links
Likenesses of New Hampshire War Heroes & Personages in the Collections of the New Hampshire State House & State Library

1747 births
1781 deaths
Adjutants general of the United States Army
Continental Army officers from New Hampshire
Continental Army staff officers
Harvard College alumni
United States military personnel killed in the American Revolutionary War
New Hampshire militiamen in the American Revolution
People from Milford, Massachusetts
18th-century cartographers
People from Durham, New Hampshire
Military personnel from Massachusetts